James William Maloney (born June 2, 1940) is a former right-handed pitcher in Major League Baseball who played with the Cincinnati Reds  and California Angels (1971). One of the hardest-throwing pitchers of the 1960s, Maloney boasted a fastball clocked at  threw two  won ten or more games from 1963 to 1969, and recorded over 200 strikeouts for four consecutive seasons

Early years
Born and raised in Fresno, California, his parents were Earl and Marjorie (née Kickashear) Maloney, and he has a sister, Jeanne. His father was a sandlot and semi-professional baseball player on the west coast in the 1930s, who later opened one of the largest used car dealerships in Fresno. After playing Little League and Babe Ruth baseball, Maloney earned a reputation as one of the finest athletes in the history of Fresno High School. 

Though he starred on the basketball and football teams, his passion was baseball. As a shortstop, he batted .310, .340, and .500 in his sophomore through senior seasons while leading the team to three consecutive undefeated seasons and Northern Yosemite League championships from 1956 to 1958. He was scouted by all 16 Major League teams as a shortstop. Maloney attended Fresno City College and the University of California at Berkeley; he was signed by scout Bobby Mattick to the Cincinnati Reds in 1959 for a reported $100,000.

Career
At age 21 in 1961, Maloney had one appearance in relief in the World Series, hurling  of an inning early in the fifth and final game as the Reds fell to the   

Injuries shortened his career, robbing him of the chance to pitch for the "Big Red Machine"—the fabled Cincinnati NL dynasty from 1970–79. Maloney was able to pitch in only seven games for the Reds in 1970, due to a ruptured Achilles tendon, and he was winless in just three starts. He was traded from the Reds to the Angels for Greg Garrett on December 15, 1970. With the Angels in 1971, he was winless in four starts and made nine other appearances in relief. Over his career, he won 134 games (all with the Reds) and lost 84, with an ERA of 3.19. In 1973, he was elected to the Cincinnati Reds Hall of Fame. As a hitter, Maloney was better than average, posting a .201 batting average (126-for-628) with 51 runs, 7 home runs, 53 RBI and 33 bases on balls. Defensively, he was about average, recording a .957 fielding percentage.

No-hitters
Maloney pitched two games in which he gave up no hits through nine innings in 1965, while going on to win 20 games that year. His first hitless nine-inning performance was on June 14 against the  This Monday night game lasted through ten scoreless innings, with Maloney striking out 18 with just  But rookie right fielder Johnny Lewis led off with a home run to center in the top of the 11th and Maloney lost the game  At the time, that game was officially recognized as a no-hitter, but the rules were later changed to omit no-hit games that were broken up in extra innings. Maloney had given up a second hit in the 11th inning; at the time he had three one-hitters to 

His second no-hitter (and first official no-hitter under current rules), was two months later on August 19 and also required ten innings, but he won that one  over the Chicago Cubs.  of a Thursday doubleheader, Maloney out-dueled Larry Jackson, with the Reds winning on a Leo Cárdenas home run with one out in the top of the tenth, which struck the left field foul pole. This was only the third no-hitter since 1901 in which the pitcher who threw it went more than nine innings. Maloney gave up 10 walks and hit a batter, the most baserunners allowed in a no-hitter since 1901. He threw 187 pitches in the game while striking out 12. With the win, he got another raise of a thousand dollars.

His second official no-hitter was on April 30, 1969, in which he beat the Houston Astros  at Crosley Field in Cincinnati, caught by 21-year-old  Maloney's pitching line that Wednesday night included 13 strikeouts and  Incidentally, the next night Don Wilson of the Astros returned the favor to the Reds, pitching his second career no-hitter in a  Astros  The double no-hitters in consecutive games was the second such occurrence in major league history. Gaylord Perry and Ray Washburn had accomplished the same feat several months earlier in

Personal
Maloney and his wife Lyn reside in Fresno, where he served as director of the city's Alcoholism and Drug Abuse Council.  three children with his

See also
List of Major League Baseball no-hitters

References

External links

1940 births
National League All-Stars
Living people
Cincinnati Reds players
California Angels players
Major League Baseball pitchers
Baseball players from California
Fresno State Bulldogs baseball players
University of California, Berkeley alumni
Minor league baseball managers
Nashville Vols players
San Diego Padres (minor league) players
Phoenix Giants players
Fresno Giants players